Ragnheiður Ríkharðsdóttir (born 23 June 1949) is an Icelandic politician. She was a member of Alþingi for the Independence Party from 2007 to 2016 and the mayor of Mosfellsbær from 2002 to 2007.

Personal life
Ragnheiður's father was Ríkharður Jónsson, a former footballer and manager who played 33 games for the Icelandic national team. Her son is former footballer Ríkharður Daðason.

References

External links 
 Non auto-biography of Ragnheiður Ríkharðsdóttir on the parliament website

Living people
1949 births
Ragnheidur Rikhardsdottir
Ragnheidur Rikhardsdottir
Place of birth missing (living people)